Saheb Bhattacharya (or Bhattacharjee) is an Indian actor who is known for his work in Bengali cinema.
He made his debut with Prabhat Roy's National Film Award winner Lathi (1996). He has since appeared in films like Gorosthane Sabdhan (2010), Iti Mrinalini (2011), Royal Bengal Rahasya (2011), Bheetu (2015), Romantic Noy (2016), Double Feluda (2016), Curzoner Kalom (2017), Uraan and Oskar 

He is son of legendary India and Mohun Bagan footballer Subrata Bhattacharya.

Career
Bhattacharya started his career in 2008 with the TV series Bandhan. He made his film debut in Gorosthane Sabdhan in 2010. Later, he appeared in films like Iti Mrinalini and Bheetu. He gained success on the big screen as Topshe in the Feluda films. He played the role of Topshe in Gorosthane Sabdhan (2010), Royal Bengal Rahasya (2011) and Double Feluda (2016).

In Television, he had acted in Kakababu Firey Elen on DD Bangla and Tahar Namti Ranjana (directed by Rituparno Ghosh) on Star Jalsha.

References

External links 
 

Bengali male television actors
Male actors in Bengali cinema
Indian male film actors
Living people
21st-century Indian male actors
1985 births